Murray Bridge railway station is located on the Adelaide to Wolseley line serving the South Australian town of Murray Bridge.

History 
Murray Bridge station was opened in 1880s as part of the Adelaide-Wolseley railway line. The line opened in stages: on 14 March 1883 from Adelaide to Aldgate, on 28 November 1883 to Nairne, on 1 May 1886 to Bordertown and on 19 January 1887 to Serviceton. It was operated by South Australian Railways, in March 1978 it was transferred to Australian National and in July 1998 to the Australian Rail Track Corporation.

Services
The only passenger rail service which stops at the station is Journey Beyond's twice weekly Overland service operating between Adelaide and Melbourne.

References

External links
Flick gallery
Johnny's Pages gallery

Railway stations in South Australia
South Australian Heritage Register